Kung Fu Panda: Legends of Awesomeness (also referred to simply as Kung Fu Panda) is an American computer-animated television comedy series spun off from DreamWorks Animation's Kung Fu Panda films. It serves as a bridge between the first and second films, showing Po's training to becoming a successful Dragon Warrior, whereas the second series is, according to the series' developer Peter Hastings, "not unlike a very long, super-deluxe 3-D version of one of our episodes".

The series was originally set to air on Nickelodeon in 2010, but it was pushed back to 2011 instead. The series premiered with a special preview on September 19, 2011, and began airing regularly on November 7. Three seasons were produced. Airing ceased in the United States partway through season 3. Before finishing up in the United States, all the episodes aired already in other countries, for example on Nicktoons in Germany from 2014–2015 and then on YTV in Canada from 2015–2016. In 2016 Nicktoons in the United States began running ads announcing the airing of new episodes; it was subsequently revealed that five of the ten unaired episodes would play from February 15 through February 19. As a result, the final episode aired on June 29, 2016.

Besides Lucy Liu and James Hong, who reprise their film roles as Viper and Mr. Ping, the cast features new voice actors for the characters of Po (Mick Wingert), Master Shifu (Fred Tatasciore), Tigress (Kari Wahlgren), Crane (Amir Talai), Monkey (James Sie), and Mantis (Max Koch).

Netflix commissioned a successor series, titled Kung Fu Panda: The Dragon Knight, in 2022. Peter Hastings, the developer of Legends of Awesomeness, returned as an executive producer. Unlike the said show, however, Jack Black will reprise his role as Po from the films.

Synopsis

Po and the Furious Five defend the Valley of Peace from villains of different kinds. All the while, Po makes accidents, learns lessons, learns more about the history of kung fu, and meets other famous kung fu masters.

Episodes

Voice cast

 Mick Wingert as Po
 Fred Tatasciore as Shifu
 Kari Wahlgren as Tigress
 Lucy Liu as Viper
 Amir Talai as Crane
 James Sie as Monkey
 Max Koch as Mantis
 James Hong as Mr. Ping

Development

The series was DreamWorks Animation's second co-production with Nickelodeon. The two companies previously partnered on The Penguins of Madagascar.

The show's musical score is done by the Track Team, most Chinese musical instruments including erhu, zhonghu, gaohu, bawu, hulusi, xiao, dizi, guqin, sanxian, suona, guanzi, xunetc. by well-known multi-instrumentalist Hong Wang. In addition, Sifu Kisu was the martial arts consultant for the show as he was on the Avatar: The Last Airbender series.

Media
Kung Fu Panda: Legends of Awesomeness took part in Nickelodeon's revamp to their cartoon season on TV. As an early promotion, Po was featured in a Nickelodeon bumper alongside other characters. On July 23, an exclusive sneak peek of the show was shown at the 2011 San Diego Comic-Con, with producers and members of the voice cast present at the panel. A sneak peek episode was released for the DVD / Blu-ray release for Kung Fu Panda 2 on December 13, 2011. In addition, two sneak preview episodes aired (one on September 19, 2011 and another on October 21, 2011) before the official premiere of the show. In June 2018, it was announced that the series will stream on Hulu.

Other dubbed versions 
In 2021, Bangladeshi television channel Duronto started to broadcast a Bengali dubbed version of this show as part of the channel's 15th season.

Critical reception
Mary McNamara of Los Angeles Times called Kung Fu Panda: Legends of Awesomeness "a show that won't drive every adult in earshot absolutely crazy. And these days, that's saying something."
Kevin McFarland of The A.V. Club said that the show "rips out the elements that made the original film such a surprise, leaving behind a derivative, cliché-laden children's show that recycles moral platitudes adequately but is otherwise indistinguishable from countless other programs" and "isn't a show that's aiming to be cutting edge or original, just mildly entertaining, which it is....This isn't going to harm any kids, but it's not going to impress them either." Despite the mixed reviews, the show has received four Emmy Awards and nominated for four Annie Awards.

Awards and nominations

Home media

Notes

References

External links

 
 

2011 American television series debuts
2016 American television series endings
2010s American animated television series
2010s Nickelodeon original programming
Animated television shows based on films
American animated television spin-offs
American children's animated action television series
American children's animated adventure television series
American children's animated comedy television series
American children's animated fantasy television series
American computer-animated television series
Anime-influenced Western animated television series
Daytime Emmy Award for Outstanding Animated Program winners
English-language television shows
Interquel television series
Kung Fu Panda television series
Martial arts television series
Nicktoons
Television series about pandas
Television series set in ancient China
Television series by DreamWorks Animation